Anett Fiebig (later Drollinger, born 2 November 1961) is a retired German swimmer who won a gold medal in the 200 m butterfly at the 1977 European Aquatics Championships. She retired from swimming in 1978.

References

1961 births
Living people
German female swimmers
German female butterfly swimmers
European Aquatics Championships medalists in swimming
People from Bezirk Karl-Marx-Stadt
People from Frankenberg, Saxony
East German female swimmers
Sportspeople from Saxony